The 1939 New Zealand rugby league tour of Great Britain and France was a scheduled tour by the New Zealand national rugby league team of Europe between September and December 1939.  After arriving in the United Kingdom in August 1939, the tour was abandoned after one match had been played due to the outbreak of the Second World War.

Invitation
In October 1938 the British Rugby Football League (RFL) invited the New Zealand Rugby League to send a team to tour Britain during the latter part of 1939. The RFL also suggested that the side visit France as well and offered to help with arrangements for the French leg.  At a special meeting of the New Zealand League Council in November 1938 both offers were accepted.

Squad
After trial games a squad of 26 players (14 backs and 12 forwards) was finalised on 13 July 1939.  

J.A. Redwood (chairman of the New Zealand Rugby League) and G. Grey Campbell (chairman of the Auckland Rugby League) were named as the co-managers of the team but Grey Campbell later withdrew due to ill-health and was replaced by R. Doble, also of the Auckland Rugby League. Canterbury forward Rex King was named captain of the team.

Tour
The squad sailed from Wellington on 27 July 1939 onboard the RMS Rangitiki and arrived in London on 29 August 1939.  Arriving at the Beechwood Hotel, Harrogate – the squad's base for the tour – on 31 August the team tried to maintain a normal attitude even in the face of the deteriorating political situation around them but acknowledged that the situation was liable to change at any time and in an interview, Doble volunteered the services of the team to help with air raid precautions in the Harrogate area. The first game of the tour took place as planned on 2 September as the tourists beat St Helens 19–3 in front of a crowd of 5,000 at Knowsley Road, but the declaration of war by Britain against Germany the following morning meant a review of the tour's viability.

An emergency meeting of the RFL tour sub-committee attended by the New Zealand managers on 5 September concluded that no further matches were possible and "the only course was to endeavour to arrange for the return of the party to New Zealand at the earliest possible moment". With the tour officially abandoned the remaining fixtures were all cancelled but while awaiting a ship home permission was given for the game against Dewsbury to take place on 9 September.  Despite being announced at short notice the game was watched by 6,200 and the tourists won 22–10 to end the tour with a 100% winning record.  Through the intervention of the New Zealand High Commissioner in London, Bill Jordan, the team were able to return to New Zealand on-board the Rangitiki – the same ship they had arrived on and arrived back in Auckland in late October.

The New Zealand Rugby League established that the curtailment of the tour had led to a net loss of £3,827 to the League.

Schedule
The schedule of games in Britain was agreed in June 1939 and the French fixtures were to be arranged while the British part of the tour was in progress.  Had the tour continued there would have been 21 games against English club sides, representative matches against Yorkshire, Lancashire and Cumberland, a test match against Wales and a three-test series against Great Britain.

References

Footnotes

Notes

1939 in New Zealand rugby league
1939 in English rugby league
1939 in Welsh sport
Rugby league tours of Great Britain
New Zealand national rugby league team tours
Cancelled sports events